Moysonec was a Native American village on the Chickahominy River in what is now New Kent County, Virginia.   The village is believed to be located near the mouth of Diascund Creek, where it enters the river.  It is notable as the presumed home of natives who captured explorer John Smith in 1607.

The site of the village was listed on the National Register of Historic Places in 1975.

See also
National Register of Historic Places listings in New Kent County, Virginia

References

Archaeological sites on the National Register of Historic Places in Virginia
Native American history of Virginia
New Kent County, Virginia
National Register of Historic Places in New Kent County, Virginia